Hack is an album by the freestyle synthpop band Information Society. The album sold quite well but did not outsell the band's first album. It is the only major-label-distributed title that has the modern Tommy Boy Records logo on it.

Artwork and packaging
The menacing car on the cover is "Vector", Kurt Harland's heavily customized 1973 Plymouth Satellite Sebring. The cassette tape for this album used an unusual naming convention for the sides. Instead of 1 and 2 or A and B, there was the Gilligan Side and the Skipper Side. The vinyl edition had a Scooby Side and a Shaggy Side.

Musical style

Riding on the success of its self-titled major-label debut, Harland decided to have the band experiment on this album with a more radical, harsher sound. The other members agreed somewhat, feeling that they should stay on level ground with the pop sensibilities. This is more pronounced on tracks like "Seek 200" and "Hard Currency". This notion eventually lead to Don't Be Afraid, Harland's solo album.

Like the others, this album is thick with samples and loops, including Kraftwerk, James Brown, Nitzer Ebb and Beastie Boys.

Star Trek references 
There are multiple references to the first Star Trek series on various tracks on the album. On the track "Charlie X", the line "I could make you all go away, any time I want to" is a reference to the episode "Charlie X". On "Come with Me," the following lines are a reference to the episode "The Changeling":

"What is the meaning?"
"Singing, What purpose is singing?" 
"I like to sing. I felt like music"

Track listing 

Note
The sub-listings under several main tracks are index 2, while each of the main tracks is index 1.  These are listed as the decimal part of the track number on the back cover of the jewel case. For example, "Slipping Away" is 14.1, "Here Is Kazmeyer" is 14.2, though they will usually play or be ripped as a single track numbered 14.''

Personnel
Adapted from AllMusic

Information Society
 Paul Robb – mixing, producer, programming
 Kurt Harland – programming, vocals
 James Cassidy – vocals
 Information Society – MIDI, producer, programming
 Think Tank – MIDI

Additional musicians
 India – backing vocals
 Nocera – backing vocals

Artwork
 Janette Beckman – photography
 Kim Champagne – art direction

Technical
 Paul Berry – assistant, assistant engineer
 Debi Cornish – assistant engineer
 Kevin Laffey – executive producer, producer
 Fred Maher – engineer, mixing, producer, programming
 Lloyd Puckitt – engineer, mixing
 Bob Rosa – engineer, mixing
 Dana Vlcek – assistant, assistant engineer

Notes

External links
 Kurt Harland comments on Hack

1990 albums
Information Society (band) albums
Albums produced by Fred Maher
Tommy Boy Records albums
Freestyle music albums